Jovovich may refer to:

Milla Jovovich (born 1975), American actress, model and musician
Galina Jovovich (born 1950), Russian actress

See also
Jovovich-Hawk, a former clothing line